The Men's ski big air competition at the FIS Freestyle Ski and Snowboarding World Championships 2023 was held on 3 and 4 March 2023.

Qualification
The qualification was started on 3 March at 12:15. The five best skiers from each heat qualified for the final.

Heat 1

Heat 2

Final
The final was started on 4 March at 15:15.

References

Men's ski big air